The 2012–13 Marquette Golden Eagles men's basketball team represented Marquette University in the 2012–13 NCAA Division I men's basketball season. Marquette was coached by Buzz Williams and played their home games at the BMO Harris Bradley Center in Milwaukee, WI as were members of the Big East Conference. They finished the season 26–9, 14–4 in Big East play to earn a share of Big East Conference regular season championship. They lost in the quarterfinals of the Big East tournament against Cincinnati. The Golden Eagles received an at-large bid to the NCAA tournament where they defeated Davidson, Butler, and Miami, before losing to Syracuse in the Elite Eight.

Previous season 
The Golden Eagles finished the 2011–12 season 26–7, 14–4 in Big East play to finish in second place. Syracuse, the winner of the Big East regular season, was later forced to vacate its wins from the season due to NCAA violations. The Eagles received an at-large bid to the NCAA tournament where they defeated BYU and Murray State to advance to the Sweet Sixteen for the second consecutive year. There they lost to Florida.

Roster

Schedule and results

|-
!colspan=9 style=|Non-conference regular season

|-
!colspan=9 style=|Big East regular season

|-
!colspan=9 style=|Big East tournament 

|-
!colspan=9 style=| NCAA tournament

References

Marquette
Marquette Golden Eagles men's basketball seasons
Marquette
Marquette
Marquette